Jonna Luthman (born 15 October 1998) is a Swedish former World Cup alpine ski racer.

She represented Sweden at the FIS Alpine World Ski Championships 2021, and was part of the Swedish team that earned a silver medal in the combined men's and women's team competition.

She announced her retirement from professional skiing on 23 January 2023.

References

External links

1998 births
Living people
Swedish female alpine skiers
Alpine skiers at the 2016 Winter Youth Olympics
21st-century Swedish women